Thomas Skynner (born Great Milton 6 June 1728; died Pinhoe 7 August 1789) was the Archdeacon of Totnes from 1772 until 1775.

Skynner was born in Great Milton and educated at Christ Church, Oxford. He was appointed a prebendary of Exeter Cathedral in 1768;  Canon in 1769; and Precentor in 1775. He was Rector of Bratton Clovelly and Vicar of Pinhoe in 1781.

References

Archdeacons of Totnes
1728 births
1789 deaths
Alumni of Christ Church, Oxford
18th-century English Anglican priests
People from Oxfordshire